This is a list of people associated with the University of San Francisco.

University presidents

 Anthony Maraschi, S.J. (1855–1862)
 Nicholas Congiato, S.J. (1862–1865)
Burchard Villiger, S.J. (1865–1866)
 Nicolas Congiato, S.J. (1866–1869)
 Joseph Bayma, S.J. (1869–1873)
Aloysius Masnata, S.J. (1873–1876)
 John Pinasco, S.J. (1876–1880)
Robert E. Kenna, S.J. (1880–1883)
 Joseph C. Sasia, S.J. (1883–1887)
 Henry Imoda, S.J. (1887–1893)
 Edward P. Allen, S.J. (1893–1896)
 John P. Frieden, S.J. (1896–1908)
 Joseph C. Sasia, S.J. (1908–1911)
 Albert F. Trivelli, S.J. (1911–1915)
 Patrick J. Foote, S.J. (1915–1919)
 Pius L. Moore, S.J. (1919–1925)
 Edward J. Whelan, S.J. (1925–1932)
 William I. Lonergan, S.J. (1932–1934)
 Harold E. Ring, S.J. (1934–1938)
 William J. Dunne, S.J. (1938–1954)
 John F. X. Connolly, S.J. (1954–1963)
 Charles W. Dullea, S.J. (1963–1969)
 Albert R. Jonsen, S.J. (1969–1972)
 William C. McInnes, S.J. (1973–1977)
 John Lo Schiavo, S.J. (1977–1991)
 John P. Schlegel, S J. (1991–2000)
 Stephen A. Privett, S.J. (2000–2014)
 Paul J. Fitzgerald, S.J. (2014–)

Notable alumni

Academia

 Ifeoma Ajunwa, professor and legal scholar
 J. M. Beattie, legal historian
 Don Betz, academic administrator 
 Dana R. Carney, professor of business and psychology 
 Marshall Drummond, academic administrator 
 Kevin Franklin, academic 
 David Herlihy, medieval and renaissance historian
 Margaret Holtrust, political scientist 
 Edward Imwinkelried, professor and legal scholar 
 Andrew Jolivette, professor 
 George Ledin, professor and computer scientist 
 Lloyd Levitin, professor and businessman 
 Tommie Lindsey, teacher
 Mark Miravalle, professor of theology 
 Thomas Nazario, professor and attorney 
 Kevin Starr, historian and State Librarian of California

Arts and Entertainment 

 Pacita Abad, Filipino-American painter
 Lilly Akseth, art historian, musician, graphic designer
 Carlos Baena, animator
 Ralph Barbieri, sports talk show host
 Craig Blais, poet
 John Brimhall, musician and author
 Cupcake Brown, author and lawyer
 Clint Catalyst, author and actor
 JuJu Chan, actress and martial artist
 George Cheung, actor and stuntman 
 John Corcoran, speechwriter for the Governor of California and White House staffer
 Ito Curata, fashion designer
 Lou Dematteis, photographer and filmmaker 
 Tomie dePaola, author and illustrator 
 Michael Dickman, poet
 George Dohrmann, Pulitzer Prize winning sports writer 
 Dossie Easton, author
 Art Edwards, writer and musician 
 Richard Egan, actor and Golden Globe winner
 Trinidad Escobar, author, poet, and cartoonist 
 Michael Franti, musician and poet
 Hengameh Ghaziani, actress 
 Patricia Giggans, writer and activist 
 Jeff Gottesfeld, novelist and television writer
 Robert Joseph Greene, author
 Kimberly Guilfoyle, attorney and television personality
 John Haase, author and dentist 
 Willyce Kim, writer
 John Anthony Lennon, musician and composer 
 Roger Lim, actor and filmmaker
 Al Madrigal, actor and comedian
 Judith Margolis, artist
 Joseph E. Marshall, author and activist 
 Peter McGehee, writer
 Joshua Mohr, author
 Stan Musilek, commercial photographer 
 David Paulides, investigator and writer
 Richard Poe, actor
 Jane Porter, author
 Rose Resnick, pianist and activist 
 Michaela Roessner, writer
 Joe Rosenthal, Pulitzer Prize winning photographer
 Charlie L. Russell, author and playwright 
 Gini Graham Scott, author and songwriter 
 Ty Segall, musician and producer
 Harri Sjöström, musician 
 Suzanne Somers, television actress 
 Joseph Stroud, poet
 Kelly Sueda, painter
 Rosana Sullivan, Pixar storyboard artist 
 Teri Suzanne, artist and actress
 Paul Vangelisti, poet 
 David Vann, writer
 Clare Vivier, fashion designer 
 Sinqua Walls, actor
 Nicole Zaloumis, radio host

Athletics

Baseball
 Jim Begley, Major League Baseball player
 Tagg Bozied, Major League Baseball player
 Mike Buskey, Major League Baseball player
 Jake Caulfield, Major League Baseball player
 Adam Cimber, Major League Baseball player
 Jermaine Clark, Major League Baseball player
 Scott Cousins, Major League Baseball player
 Dustin Delucchi, Minor League Baseball player
 Con Dempsey, Major League Baseball player
 Clarence Fieber, Major League Baseball player
 Jesse Foppert, Major League Baseball player
 Joe Giannini, Major League Baseball player
 Jeff Harris, Major League Baseball player
 Stan Johnson, Major League Baseball player
 Jim Mangan, Major League Baseball player
 J.D. Martin, Major League Baseball player
 Windy McCall, Major League Baseball player
 Gil McDougald, Major League Baseball player
 Greg Moore, Major League Baseball player
 Alyssa Nakken, first female Major League Baseball coach
 Joe Nelson, Major League Baseball player
 Aaron Pointer, Major League Baseball player
 Aaron Poreda, Major League Baseball player
 Bill Renna, Major League Baseball player
 Paul Schramka, Major League Baseball player
 Neill Sheridan, Major League Baseball player
 Justin Speier, Major League Baseball player
 Ernie Sulik, Major League Baseball player
 Bradley Zimmer, Major League Baseball player
 Kyle Zimmer, Major League Baseball player

Basketball

 John Benington, college basketball player and coach
 Carl Boldt, college basketball player
 Jamaree Bouyea, college basketball player
 Winford Boynes, NBA player
 Jim Brovelli, college basketball player and coach
 Gene Brown, college basketball player
 Wallace Bryant, NBA player
 Angelo Caloiaro, Israeli Premier League and EuroLeague basketball player
 Damian Cantrell, professional basketball player
 Bill Cartwright, NBA player and head coach of the Chicago Bulls
 John Cox, EuroLeague basketball player and Olympian
 Pete Cross, NBA player
 Quintin Dailey, NBA player
 Moustapha Diarra, professional basketball player
 Cole Dickerson, professional basketball player in the Nemzeti Bajnokság I/A
 Joe Ellis, NBA player
 Mike Farmer, NBA player
 Eric Fernsten, NBA player
 Frankie Ferrari, professional basketball player
 Bob Gaillard, college basketball player and coach
 James Hardy, NBA player
 Rene Herrerias, college basketball player and coach
 Russell Hinder, professional basketball player in the National Basketball League (Australia) 
 Avry Holmes, professional basketball player 
 Joy Hollingsworth, basketball player and coach
 Ollie Johnson, NBA player
 Byron Jones, NBA player
 K.C. Jones, NBA player, coach, and Basketball Hall of Famer
 Kenyon Jones, professional basketball player
 Fred LaCour, NBA player
 Dave Lee, American Basketball Association player
 Don Lofgran, NBA player
 Dior Lowhorn, professional basketball player
 Jimbo Lull, professional basketball player
 Matt McCarthy, professional basketball player
 Joe McNamee, American Basketball Association player
 Kevin Mouton, college basketball coach
 Erwin Mueller, NBA player
 Jerry Mullen, NBA player
 Paul Napolitano, NBA player
 Jimmy Needles, professional and Olympic basketball coach
 Hal Perry, college basketball player
 Mike Preaseau, college basketball player
 Manny Quezada, professional basketball player
 Marlon Redmond, NBA player
 Billy Reid, NBA player
 Kevin Restani, NBA player
 Bill Russell, NBA player, coach, and Basketball Hall of Famer
 Ross Giudice, player & coach
 Fred Scolari, NBA player
 Orlando Smart, professional basketball player
 Phil Smith, NBA player
 Shamell Stallworth, professional basketball player
 Rodney Tention, professional basketball coach
 Mark Tollefsen, Israeli Premier League basketball player
 Ime Udoka, NBA player and coach
 Kwame Vaughn, Liga Leumit basketball player
 Alan Wiggins Jr., professional basketball player
 Guy Williams, NBA player
 Mikey Williams, professional basketball player
 Andy Wolfe, college basketball player and attorney
 Willie "Woo Woo" Wong, professional basketball player

Football

 Ernie Barber, NFL player
 Jim Barber, NFL player
 Roy Barni, NFL player
 Ed Brown, NFL player
 George Buksar, NFL player
 Bill Dando, college football player and coach
 Mike Davlin, NFL player
 Mike Donohoe, NFL player
 Keith Dorney, NFL player
 Forrest Hall, professional football player
 Jeff Horton, football coach
 Russ Letlow, NFL player
 Gino Marchetti, NFL player and Pro Football Hall of Famer
 Ollie Matson, NFL player and Pro Football Hall of Famer
 Ken McAlister, NFL player
 Dave Olerich, NFL player
 Don Panciera, NFL player
 Ray Peterson, NFL player
 Harmon Rowe, NFL player
 Pete Rozelle, Commissioner of the NFL (1960-1989) and Pro Football Hall of Famer
 John Sanchez, NFL player
 Joe Scott, NFL player
 Joe Scudero, NFL player
 Larry Siemering, NFL player
 Bob St. Clair, NFL player and Pro Football Hall of Famer
 Dick Stanfel, NFL player and Pro Football Hall of Famer
 Red Stephens, NFL player
 Ralph Thomas, NFL player
 Burl Toler, first African-American official in the NFL
 Vince Tringali, NFL player
 Carroll Vogelaar, NFL player

Soccer

 Luis Aguilar, professional soccer player
 Miguel Aguilar, Major League Soccer player
 John Anton, professional soccer player
 Koulis Apostolidis, professional soccer player
 Peter Arnautoff, professional soccer player
 Hunter Ashworth, professional soccer player
 Andy Atuegbu, professional soccer player
 Marko Bedenikovic, professional soccer player
 Samantha Brand, professional soccer player
 John Brooks, professional soccer player
 Bryan Burke, professional soccer player
 Aaron Chandler, Major League Soccer player and lawyer
 Conor Chinn, Major League Soccer player
 Bjørn Dahl, soccer player and manager of SK Brann
 Troy Dayak, Major League Soccer player
 John Doyle, professional soccer player, Olympian, and general manager of the San Jose Earthquakes
 Tony Graham, professional soccer player
 Josh Hansen, professional soccer player
 Mike Ivanow, Major League Soccer player and Olympian
 Stephen Negoesco, professional soccer player and National Soccer Hall of Famer
 Brandon McDonald, Major League Soccer player
 Chris McDonald, professional soccer player
 Josh McKay, Major League Soccer player
 Greg McKeown, Major League Soccer player
 Lothar Osiander, Major League Soccer coach
 Fiona O'Sullivan, professional soccer player and coach
 Manny Padilla, professional soccer player
 Mal Roche, professional soccer player
 Chris Rodd, professional soccer player
 David Romney, Major League Soccer player
 Tyler Ruthven, professional soccer player
 Lou Sagastume, professional soccer player and coach
 Madalyn Schiffel, professional soccer player
 Christopher Schwarze, professional soccer player
 Nathan Simeon, college soccer player
 Joshua Smith, professional soccer player
 Autumn Smithers, professional soccer player
 Ståle Søbye, professional soccer player
 Leticia Torres, professional soccer player
 Bjørn Tronstad, professional soccer player
 Rob Valentino, Major League Soccer player
 Glenn van Straatum, professional soccer player
 Tim Weaver, Major League Soccer player
 Marquis White, Major League Soccer player
 Camille Wilson, professional soccer player
 Yue Yixing, professional soccer player

Tennis

 Peanut Louie Harper, professional tennis player 
 Art Larsen, professional tennis player and International Tennis Hall of Famer
 Harry Likas, professional tennis player
 Sam Match, professional tennis player

Other
 Todd Fischer, professional golfer
 Dean Karnazes, ultra-marathon runner
 Mariya Koroleva, synchronized swimmer and Olympian
 Tatiana Lysenko, gymnast and Olympian
 Marcus McElhenney, rower and Olympian
 Haley Nemra, track athlete and Olympian
 Juliet Starrett, two-time whitewater rafting world champion and businesswoman 
 Charlotte Taylor, long-distance runner
 Maor Tiyouri, long-distance runner

Business
 Segun Agbaje, banker and director of Guaranty Trust Bank 
 Jean-Charles Boisset, vinter and proprietor of the Boisset Collection
 Gordon Bowker, Jerry Baldwin, and Zev Siegl, co-founders of Starbucks and Redhook Ale Brewery
 Caleb Chan, businessman and philanthropist
 Alfred Chuang, founder and CEO of BEA Systems
 Patricia Cloherty, businesswoman and financier 
 Chung Eui-sun, Chairman of Hyundai Motor Group
 Jon Fisher, technology entrepreneur, investor, and inventor 
 Byington Ford, real estate developer
 Gordon Getty, businessman and philanthropist 
 John Paul Getty Jr., (did not graduate), philanthropist 
 William Randolph Hearst II, businessman 
 Hekani Jakhalu Kense, social entrepreneur and lawyer
 Lloyd Levitin, businessman and professor 
 Jim Long, businessman and music industry entrepreneur 
 Andrey Muravyov, businessman and entrepreneur 
 Ron Najafi, pharmaceutical entrepreneur 
 Paul Otellini, President and CEO of Intel
 Ruth Parasol, businesswoman and entrepreneur 
 Marjorie Scardino, businesswoman 
 Weijian Shan, economist and businessman 
 Lip-Bu Tan, businessman and executive 
 John Witchel, businessman and two-time Pan American Games swimming gold medalist
 Dave Yeske, financial planner and professor

Government and Politics

Members of Congress

 John Burton, member of the United States House of Representatives (1974-1983), California State Assembly (1965-1974; 1988–1996); California State Senate (1996-2004); and Chair of the California Democratic Party (1973-1974; 2009–2017)
 Sala Burton, member of the United States House of Representatives (1983-1987)
 John E. Cunningham, member of the United States House of Representatives (1977-1979), Washington Senate (1975-1977), and Washington House of Representatives (1973-1975)
 James D. Phelan, United States Senator for California (1915-1921) and Mayor of San Francisco (1897-1902)
 Pierre Salinger, United States Senator for California (1964) and White House Press Secretary (1961-1964)
 John F. Shelley, member of the United States House of Representatives (1949-1969), California Senate (1939-1947), and Mayor of San Francisco (1964-1968)
 Lynn Woolsey, member of the United States House of Representatives (1993-2013)
 Kevin Mullin, member of the United States House of Representatives ,former Speaker pro tempore and member of the California State Assembly (2012–2022)

Members of State and Territorial Legislatures

 Katherine B. Aguon, Senator of the Guam Legislature (1977-1979)
 Wesley Chesbro, member of the California State Assembly (2008-2014) and California State Senate (1998-2006)
 Bill Duplissea, member of the California State Assembly (1986-1988)
 Paul Fong, member of the California State Assembly (2008-2014)
 Mary Hayashi, member of the California State Assembly (2006-2012)
 Randy Iwase, member of the Hawaii Senate (1990-2000)
 Susan C. Lee, member of the Maryland House of Delegates (2002-2015) and Maryland Senate (2015–present)
 Sylvia Luke, member of the Hawaii House of Representatives (1999–present)
 J. Eugene McAteer, member of the California Senate (1959-1967)
 John F. McCarthy, member of the California Senate (1950-1971)
 Robert I. McCarthy, member of the California Senate (1955-1959) and California State Assembly (1949-1953)
 Bill Monning, member of the California State Assembly (2008-2012) and California Senate (2012-2020)
 Gene Mullin, member of the California State Assembly (2002-2008) and Mayor of South San Francisco (1997-1998; 2001–2002)
 Frank S. Petersen, member of the California Senate (1963-1967) and Judge on the Del Norte County Superior Court (1966-1988)
 Julia Ratti, member of the Nevada Senate (2016-2021)
 Michael A. Rice, member of the Rhode Island House of Representatives (2009-2011)
 Don Sebastiani, member of the California State Assembly (1980-1986)

State and Territorial Executive Offices

 Elizabeth Barrett-Anderson, Attorney General of Guam (2015-2019)
 Ricardo Bordallo, Governor of Guam (1975-1979; 1983–1987)
 Ron Knecht, Nevada State Controller (2015-2019) and member of the Nevada Assembly (2002-2004)
 Thomas C. Lynch, Attorney General of California (1964-1971) and District Attorney of San Francisco (1951-1964)
 Leo T. McCarthy, Lieutenant Governor of California (1983-1995)
 John Mockler, California Secretary of Education (2000-2002)
 Bill Schuette, Attorney General of Michigan (2011-2019), member of the United States House of Representatives (1985-1991), state legislator, and Justice of the Michigan Court of Appeals
 Faoa Aitofele Sunia, Lieutenant Governor of American Samoa (2003-2013)

Municipal and Local Offices

 Angela Alioto, member and president of the San Francisco Board of Supervisors (1989-1997)
 London Breed, Mayor of San Francisco (2018–present)
 Robert Coleman-Senghor, Mayor of Cotati, California (2010-2011) and professor 
 Preet Didbal, Mayor of Yuba City, California (2014-2018)
 John C. Houlihan, Mayor of Oakland (1961-1966)
 Frank Jordan, Mayor of San Francisco (1992-1996) and Chief of the San Francisco Police Department (1986-1990)
 Dan Kalb, member of the Oakland City Council (2013–present)
 Suzy Loftus, interim District Attorney of San Francisco (2019-2020)
 Carlos Menchaca, member of the New York City Council (2014-2021)
 John E. Manders, Mayor of Anchorage (1945-1946)
 Mike Nevin, Mayor and city councilman of Daly City, California (1982-1989) and member of the San Mateo County Board of Supervisors
 Katy Tang, member of the San Francisco Board of Supervisors (2013-2019)
 Joseph E. Tinney, member of the San Francisco Board of Supervisors (1961-1966) and San Francisco City Assessor (1966-1979)
 Brendon Woods, Public Defender of Alameda County, California (2012–present)

Diplomatic Offices

 Robert F. Kane, U.S. Ambassador to Ireland (1984-1985) and Justice of the California Court of Appeals (1971-1979)
 Richard Morefield, diplomat and American Consul General to Iran during the Iran hostage crisis
 Richard M. Tobin, banker and U.S. Ambassador to the Netherlands (1923-1929)

International Offices

 Iggy Arroyo, member of the House of Representatives of the Philippines (2004-2012)
 Alfred Chen, businessman and member of the Legislative Yuan of Taiwan (2004-2005)
 Jason Kenney, (did not graduate), Premier of Alberta (2019–2022)
 Alejandro Toledo, President of Peru (2001-2006)
 Hsiao Uan-u, member of the Legislative Yuan of Taiwan (1999-2002)
 You Hwai-yin, member of the Legislative Yuan of Taiwan (1993-2001)

Other Governmental Offices and Titles
 John F. Blake, Deputy Director of the Central Intelligence Agency (1977-1978)
 Joann G. Camacho, First Lady of Guam (2003-2011)
 Martha Kanter, United States Under Secretary of Education (2009-2013)
 Arthur Ohnimus, Chief Clerk of the California State Assembly (1923-1937; 1941–1963)
 James G. Smyth, Chief Clerk of the California State Assembly (1937-1939)
 Eric Ueland, government official and political advisor

Journalism
 Warren Brown, sportswriter
 Emily Compagno, political commentator and attorney
 Delia Gallagher, CNN journalist
 Moira Gunn, academic, radio host, and journalist
 Warren Hinckle, political journalist
 Jennifer Jolly, Emmy Award winning journalist
 Vicky Nguyen, NBC News journalist
 James Raser, radio producer and sportscaster 
 Dick Spotswood, columnist 
 Allen Wastler, financial journalist
 Olivier Weber, writer, journalist, and war-correspondent

Law and Justice

Judges

 Saundra Brown Armstrong, Judge on the United States District Court for the Northern District of California (1991–present)
 Ming Chin, Justice of the Supreme Court of California (1996-2020) and California Court of Appeal (1990-1996)
 Daniel Foley, Judge of the Hawaii Intermediate Court of Appeals and Associate Justice of the Supreme Court of Palau
 Roger D. Foley, Judge and Chief Judge of the United States District Court for the District of Nevada (1962-1996) and Attorney General of Nevada (1959-1962)
 Harold Haley, Judge on the Marin County Superior Court (1965-1970) and victim of the Marin County Civic Center attacks (1970)
 George Bernard Harris, Justice and Chief Judge of the United States District Court for the Northern District of California (1946-1983)
 Martin Jenkins, Justice of the Supreme Court of California (2020–present) and California Court of Appeal (2008-2019)
 William R. McGuiness, Justice of the California Court of Appeal (2002–present) 
 Buell A. Nesbett, first Chief Justice of the Alaska Supreme Court (1959-1970)
 William Newsom, Justice of the California Court of Appeal (1978-1995)
 Edward Joseph Schwartz, Judge and Chief Judge of the United States District Court for the Southern District of California (1968-2000)
 Jeremiah F. Sullivan, Justice of the Supreme Court of California (1926-1927)
 Matt Sullivan, Chief Justice of the Supreme Court of California (1914-1915)
 Raymond L. Sullivan, Justice of the Supreme Court of California (1966-1977) and California Court of Appeal (1961-1966)
 William Thomas Sweigert, Judge of the United States District Court for the Northern District of California (1973-1983)
 Mary Jane Theis, Justice of the Illinois Supreme Court (2010–present)  and Illinois Appellate Court (1993-2010)
 Gary W. Thomas, Judge on the Marin County Superior Court (1986-1998)
 Dorothy von Beroldingen, Judge on the San Francisco County Superior Court (1977-1999) and member of the San Francisco Board of Supervisors (1966-1977)
 James Ward, Justice of the California Courts of Appeal (1996–present)
 Kandis Westmore, Magistrate Judge of the United States District Court for the Northern District of California (2012–present)

Law Enforcement
 Heather Fong, Chief of the San Francisco Police Department (2004-2009)
 Michael Hennessey, Sheriff of San Francisco (1980-2012)
 Ross Mirkarimi, Sheriff of San Francisco (2012-2016)
 Danielle Outlaw, Philadelphia Police Commissioner (2020–present) and Chief of the Portland Police Bureau (2017-2019)
 William J. Quinn, Chief of the San Francisco Police Department (1929-1940)

Other Legal Figures

 Lina Abu Akleh, human rights advocate 
 Tom Asimou, attorney
 Thomas Anthony Durkin, attorney
 Scott Edward Cole, attorney
 Vincent Hallinan, attorney and Progressive Party candidate in the 1952 United States presidential election
 Hekani Jakhalu, attorney and social entrepreneur 
 Geneviéve Jones-Wright, defense attorney 
 Frederick J. Kenney, Judge Advocate General of the United States Coast Guard (2011-2014)
 Jay Leiderman, attorney
 Mark Massara, attorney and conservationist 
 Kevin V. Ryan, United States Attorney for the Northern District of California (2002-2007)
 Patricia A. Shiu, Director of the Federal Contract Compliance (2009-2016)
 Joe Alioto Veronese, attorney and civil servant
 Chan Chung Wing, first Chinese American attorney in California

Military

 Leven Cooper Allen, Major General of the United States Army
 Robert D. Bohn, Major General of the United States Marine Corps
 Kenneth J. Houghton, Major General of the United States Marine Corps
 Kenneth McLennan, General of the United States Marine Corps

Religious Figures and Clergy

 Tod Brown, Bishop of Orange (1998-2012) and Bishop of Boise (1989-1998)
 Charles J. Chaput, Archbishop of Philadelphia (2011-2020), Archbishop of Denver (1997-2011), and Bishop of Rapid City (1988-1997)
 Thomas Anthony Daly, Bishop of Spokane (2017–present)
 Kyrill Dmitrieff, Orthodox Archbishop of San Francisco and Western America (2000–present) 
 Francis P. Filice, Roman Catholic priest and professor at the University of San Francisco
 Gino Geraci, pastor and radio host
 William J. Justice, Auxiliary Bishop of San Francisco (2008-2017)
 Steven J. Lopes, Bishop of the Personal Ordinariate of the Chair of Saint Peter (2016–present)
 Chad Ripperger, Catholic priest and theologian 
 John Charles Wester, Archbishop of Santa Fe (2015–present) and Bishop of Salt Lake City (2007-2015)

Royalty and Nobility 
 Prince Edouard-Xavier de Lobkowicz (1960–1984), French military officer and murder victim
 Prince Alexander of Yugoslavia, Serbian prince

Science, Technology, and Medicine
 Luis Felipe Baptista, ornithologist 
 Augustus Jesse Bowie Jr., inventor and electricity innovator 
 Sunney Chan, biophysical chemist 
 Dan Dugan, inventor and audio engineer 
 Christopher Erhardt, video game designer and educator 
 John Joseph Montgomery, physicist and inventor specializing in aviation 
 Kathi Mooney, professor and cancer specialist 
 Bruce Ogilvie, sports psychologist 
 Tatjana Piotrowski, geneticist 
 Michael A. Rice, fisheries scientist
 Janese Swanson, inventor and software developer 
 Francis Xavier Williams, entomologist

Faculty
Alma Flor Ada, professor of education; author
Shalanda Baker, professor of law
Micah Ballard, professor of writing; poet 
Ari Banias, professor of writing; poet
David Batstone, professor of business; author, theologian, and activist
Lara Bazelon, professor of law
Stephen Beachy, professor of writing
Catherine Brady, professor of writing; author
Winfried Brugger, professor of law; author and philosopher
Paul Chien, professor of biology
Michael Chorost, professor of rhetoric and composition
Jasmin Darznik, professor of writing; author
Sergio De La Torre, professor of photography and film
Peter Masten Dunne, professor of history
John H. Elliott, professor of theology; Biblical scholar
Moshé Feldenkrais, professor of education; engineer and physicist
Francis P. Filice, professor of biology; Roman Catholic priest and activist
Jon Fisher, professor of business; entrepreneur and author
Arthur Furst, professor of medicinal chemistry and pharmacology 
Edna Garabedian, professor of voice; opera mezzo-soprano
Guillermo García Oropeza, professor of literature and architecture
Sam Green, professor of film; documentary filmmaker
Moira Gunn, professor of biotechnology; journalist 
Oren Harari, professor of business; author
Maya Harris, professor of law
Andrew R. Heinze, professor of history; playwright and author
Jane Hirshfield, professor of poetry; poet
Vamsee Juluri, professor of media studies
Deneb Karentz, professor of biology
Edward L. Kessel, professor of biology
Laleh Khadivi, professor writing; novelist and filmmaker 
Herbert R. Kohl, professor of education
Michael Kudlick, professor of computer science 
Art Lande, professor of music
Emille D. Lawrence, professor of mathematics and statistics
Jerzy Jan Lerski, professor of political science and history
Madeleine Lim, professor of film studies; activist 
W. Michael Mathes, professor of history
J. Thomas McCarthy, professor of law
Ruthanne Lum McCunn, professor of literature and writing; author
Jake McGoldrick, professor of English; member of the San Francisco Board of Supervisors (2001-2008)
Kirke Mechem, professor of music and composer-in-residence
Donald Merrifield, professor of physics; Roman Catholic priest and university administrator 
Patrick J. Miller, professor of computer science
Rusty Morrison, professor of poetry; poet
Margaret Morse, professor of film and video arts
Joseph Nation, professor of economics; member of the California State Assembly (2000-2006)
Thomas Nazario, professor of law
Elliot Neaman, professor of history
Tristan Needham, professor of mathematics
Michael O'Neill, professor of management 
Robert T. Orr, professor of zoology and biology
John Jay Osborn Jr., professor of contract law
Terence Parr, professor of computer science
Eva Paterson, professor of public interest and civil rights law
John A. Powell, professor of law
Dean Rader, professor of English; poet
William Ratliff, professor of foreign policy and history
Barbara Jane Reyes, professor of Filipino studies
David Roderick, professor of writing; poet
John Rothmann, professor of politics; radio host
James V. Schall, professor of theology and philosophy; Roman Catholic priest
Dan Schutte, professor of music and composer-in-residence
Aaron Shurin, professor of writing; poet
Carol Ruth Silver, professor of public policy; member of the San Francisco Board of Supervisors (1978-1989)
Jessica Snow, professor of art; artist
K.M. Soehnlein, professor of writing
Kevin Starr, professor of history; historian and State Librarian of California
Susan Steinberg, professor of English; author
John Stillwell, professor of mathematics
Jeremiah F. Sullivan, professor of law; Justice of the California Supreme Court (1926-1927)
Rachel Thomas, professor of technology and data ethics
John B. Tsu, professor of East Asian studies
Leo Valledor, professor of art
Andrew Vázsonyi, professor of business
Heinz Weihrich, professor of global management and administration
Kathryn Werdegar, professor of law; Justice of the Supreme Court of California (1994-2017)
Nicole Wong, professor of media and internet law; Deputy Chief Technology Officer of the United States (2013-2014)
Paul Zeitz, professor of mathematics
Rose Zimbardo, professor of English literature 
Stephen Zunes, professor of politics

Administrators and Staff
 Robert L. Niehoff, Associate Provost and Vice President for Planning and Budgeting; Roman Catholic priest
Glori Simmons, director of the Thacher Gallery; poet
Matt Sullivan, professor and first Dean of the School of Law (1912-1937); Chief Justice of the Supreme Court of California (1914-1915)
John D. Trasviña, Dean of the School of Law (2013-2018) and Assistant Secretary of the Office of Fair Housing and Equal Opportunity (2009-2013)

Honorary degrees

Recipients of USF honorary degrees include the following:

September 2003 – Dalai Lama, the 14th Dalai Lama, was awarded an honorary doctoral degree from USF on September 5, 2003, for his lifelong work in promoting peace and compassion, and helping to bring about a more humane world.
December 2004 – Gloria Macapagal Arroyo, Philippine President
April 2005 – Kim Dae-jung, the former president of South Korea and 2000 Nobel Peace Prize winner who helped lead his country's movement toward democratic rule
2005 – Terry Karl, professor of Latin American Studies at Stanford University, Doctor of Humane Letters, honoris causa, as a result of her human rights work.
May 2005 – Shirin Ebadi, Iranian human rights activist
May 2006 – Richard Blum, founder and chairman of the Himalayan Foundation
May 2006 – Gloria Duffy, CEO of the Commonwealth Club of California
May 2006 – Michael Tilson Thomas, music director of the San Francisco Symphony
May 2007 – Leo T. McCarthy (posthumous honorary degree)
December 2007 – the Reverend Glenda Hope, founder of Network Ministries.  Hope embodies cultural service that respects the individual dignity of every person, most notably the poor, the homeless, prostitutes, and those living with HIV/AIDS in San Francisco's Tenderloin neighborhood.
December 2007 – Sayadaw U Kovida on behalf of the Buddhist monks of Burma. The monks were honored for their courage in rising up in peaceful protest against their country's oppressive military regime. Their actions reflect the university's mission to educate leaders who will fashion a more humane and just world.
December 2007 – Gerald McKevitt, S.J., Santa Clara University history professor and university historian. McKevitt is renowned for his knowledge of Jesuit history in California and the West, and received an honorary degree for his dedication to teaching, scholarship, and service to the university community.
September 2008 – Greg Mortenson, co-author of Three Cups of Tea; executive director of the Central Asia Institute
December 2008 – Mary McAleese, the president of Ireland

Other recipients of honorary degrees include Nobel Peace Prize laureate Shirin Ebadi, journalist Helen Thomas, and the late South African activist Stephen Biko.

References

External links
 USF Alumni Association homepage

University of San Francisco
University of San Francisco
University of San Francisco